Basra (Kurdish: بەسڕە, Romanized: Basra) is a city in southern Iraq located on the Shatt al-Arab in the Arabian Peninsula. It had an estimated population of 1.4 million in 2018. Basra is also Iraq's main port, although it does not have deep water access, which is handled at the port of Umm Qasr. However, there is ongoing construction of Grand Faw Port on the coast of Basra, which is considered a national project for Iraq and will become one of the largest ports in the world and the largest in the Middle East, in addition, the port will strengthen Iraq’s geopolitical position in the region and the world.  Furthermore, Iraq is planning to establish large naval base in the Faw peninsula.

Historically, the city is one of the ports from which the fictional Sinbad the Sailor journeyed. The city was built in 636 and has  played an important role in  Islamic Golden Age. Basra is consistently one of the hottest cities in Iraq, with summer temperatures regularly exceeding . In April 2017, the Iraqi Parliament recognized Basra as Iraq's economic capital.

Etymology

The city has had many names throughout its history, Basrah being the most common. In Arabic, the word baṣrah means "the overwatcher," which may have been an allusion to the city's origin as an Arab military base against the Sassanids. Others have argued that the name is derived from the Aramaic word basratha, meaning "place of huts, settlement."

History

Rashidun Caliphate (632–661)
The city was founded at the beginning of the Islamic era in 636 and began as a garrison encampment for Arab tribesmen constituting the armies of the Rashidun Caliph Umar. A tell a few kilometers south of the present city, still marks the original site which was a military site. While defeating the forces of the Sassanid Empire there, the Muslim commander Utbah ibn Ghazwan erected his camp on the site of an old Persian military settlement called Vaheštābād Ardašīr, which was destroyed by the Arabs. The name Al-Basrah, which in Arabic means "the over watching" or "the seeing everything," was given to it because of its role as a military base against the Sassanid Empire. However, other sources claim the name originates from the Persian word Bas-rāh or Bassorāh meaning "where many ways come together."

In 639 Umar established this encampment as a city with five districts, and appointed Abu Musa al-Ash'ari as its first governor. The city was built in a circular plan according to the Partho-Sasanian architecture. Abu Musa led the conquest of Khuzestan from 639 to 642 and was ordered by Umar to aid Uthman ibn Abi al-As, then fighting Iran from a new, more easterly miṣr at Tawwaj.  In 650, the Rashidun Caliph Uthman reorganised the Persian frontier, installed ʿAbdullah ibn Amir as Basra's governor, and put the military's southern wing under Basra's control. Ibn Amir led his forces to their final victory over Yazdegerd III, the Sassanid King of Kings.

In 656, Uthman was murdered and Ali was appointed Caliph. Ali first installed Uthman ibn Hanif as Basra's governor, who was followed by ʿAbdullah ibn ʿAbbas. These men held the city for Ali until the latter's death in 661.

Infrastructure
Why Basra was chosen as a site for the new city remains unclear. The original site lay 15 km from the Shatt al-Arab and thus lacked access to maritime trade and, more importantly, to fresh water. Additionally, neither historical texts nor archaeological finds indicate that there was much of an agricultural hinterland in the area before Basra was founded. Indeed, in an anecdote related by al-Baladhuri, al-Ahnaf ibn Qays pleaded to the caliph Umar that, whereas other Muslim settlers were established in well-watered areas with extensive farmland, the people of Basra had only "reedy salt marsh which never dries up and where pasture never grows, bounded on the east by brackish water and on the west by waterless desert. We have no cultivation or stock farming to provide us with our livelihood or food, which comes to us as through the throat of an ostrich."

Nevertheless, Basra overcame these natural disadvantages and rapidly grew into the second-largest city in Iraq, if not the entire Islamic world. Its role as a military encampment meant that the soldiers had to be fed, and since those soldiers were receiving government salaries, they had money to spend. Thus, both the government and private entrepreneurs invested heavily in developing a vast agricultural infrastructure in the Basra region. These investments were made with the expectation of a profitable return, indicating the value of the Basra food market. Although Zanj slaves from Africa were put to work on these construction projects, most of the labor was done by free men working for wages. Governors sometimes directly supervised these projects, but usually they simply assigned the land while most of the financing was done by private investors.

The result of these investments was a massive irrigation system covering some 57,000 hectares between the Shatt al-Arab and the now-dry western channel of the Tigris. This system was first reported in 962, when just 8,000 hectares of it remained in use, for the cultivation of date palms, while the rest had become desert. This system consists of a regular pattern of two-meter-high ridges in straight lines, separated by old canal beds. The ridges are extremely saline, with salt deposits up to 20 centimeters thick, and are completely barren. The former canal beds are less salty and can support a small population of salt-resistant plants. Contemporary authors recorded how the Zanj slaves were put to work clearing the fields of salty topsoil and putting them into piles; the result was the ridges that remain today. This represents an enormous amount of work: H.S. Nelson calculated that 45 million tons of earth were moved in total, and with his extremely high estimate of one man moving two tons of soil per day, this would have taken a decade of strenuous work by 25,000 men.

Ultimately, Basra's irrigation canals were unsustainable, because they were built at too little of a slope for the water flow to carry salt deposits away. This required the clearing of salty topsoil by the Zanj slaves in order to keep the fields from becoming too saline to grow crops. After Basra was sacked in by Zanj rebels in the late 800s and then by the Qarmatians in the early 900s, there was no financial incentive to invest in restoring the irrigation system, and the infrastructure was almost completely abandoned. Finally, in the late 900s, the city of Basra was entirely relocated, with the old site being abandoned and a new one developing on the banks of the Shatt al-Arab, where it has remained ever since.

Umayyad Caliphate (661–750)
The Sufyanids held Basra until Yazid I's death in 683. The Sufyanids' first governor was Umayyad ʿAbdullah, a renowned military leader, commanding fealty and financial demands from Karballah, but poor governor. In 664, Muʿawiyah I replaced him with Ziyad ibn Abi Sufyan, often called "ibn Abihi" ("son of his own father"), who became infamous for his draconian rules regarding public order. On Ziyad's death in 673, his son ʿUbaydullah ibn Ziyad became governor. In 680, Yazid I ordered ʿUbaydullah to keep order in Kufa as a reaction to Hussein ibn Ali's popularity as the grandson of the Islamic Prophet Muhammad. ʿUbaydullah took over the control of Kufa. Hussein sent his cousin as an ambassador to the people of Kufa, but ʿUbaydullah executed Hussein's cousin Muslim ibn Aqeel amid fears of an uprising. ʿUbaydullah amassed an army of thousands of soldiers and fought Hussein's army of approximately 70 in a place called Karbala near Kufa. ʿUbaydullah's army was victorious; Hussein and his followers were killed and their heads were sent to Yazid as proof.

Ibn al-Harith spent his year in office trying to put down Nafi' ibn al-Azraq's Kharijite uprising in Khuzestan. In 685, Ibn al-Zubayr, requiring a practical ruler, appointed Umar ibn Ubayd Allah ibn Ma'mar Finally, Ibn al-Zubayr appointed his own brother Mus'ab. In 686, the revolutionary al-Mukhtar led an insurrection at Kufa, and put an end to ʿUbaydullah ibn Ziyad near Mosul. In 687, Musʿab defeated al-Mukhtar with the help of Kufans who Mukhtar exiled.

Abd al-Malik ibn Marwan reconquered Basra in 691, and Basra remained loyal to his governor al-Hajjaj during Ibn Ashʿath's mutiny (699–702). However, Basra did support the rebellion of Yazid ibn al-Muhallab against Yazid II during the 720s.

Abbasid Caliphate and its Golden Age (750–1258)
In the late 740s, Basra fell to as-Saffah of the Abbasid Caliphate.  During the time of the Abbasids, Basra became an intellectual center and home to the elite Basra School of Grammar, the rival and sister school of the Kufa School of Grammar.  Several outstanding intellectuals of the age were Basrans; Arab polymath Ibn al-Haytham, the Arab literary giant al-Jahiz, and the Sufi mystic Rabia Basri. The Zanj Rebellion by the agricultural slaves of the lowlands affected the area. In 871, the Zanj sacked Basra. In 923, the Qarmatians, an extremist Muslim sect, invaded and devastated Basra.

From 945 to 1055, the Iranian Buyid dynasty ruled Baghdad and most of Iraq. Abu al Qasim al-Baridis, who still controlled Basra and Wasit, were defeated and their lands taken by the Buyids in 947. Adud al-Dawla and his sons Diya' al-Dawla and Samsam al-Dawla were the Buyid rulers of Basra during the 970s, 980s and 990s.  Sanad al-Dawla al-Habashi (–977), the brother of the Emir of Iraq Izz al-Dawla, was governor of Basra and built a library of 15,000 books.

The Oghuz Turk Tughril Beg was the leader of the Seljuks, who expelled the Shiite Buyid dynasty. He was the first Seljuk ruler to style himself Sultan and Protector of the Abbasid Caliphate.

The Great Friday Mosque was constructed in Basra. In 1122, Imad ad-Din Zengi received Basra as a fief. In 1126, Zengi suppressed a revolt and in 1129, Dabis looted the Basra state treasury.
A 1200 map "on the eve of the Mongol invasions" shows the Abbasid Caliphate as ruling lower Iraq and, presumably, Basra.

The Assassin Rashid-ad-Din-Sinan was born in Basra on or between 1131 and 1135.

Mongol rule and thereafter (1258-)
In 1258, the Mongols under Hulegu Khan sacked Baghdad and ended Abbasid rule. By some accounts, Basra capitulated to the Mongols to avoid a massacre. The Mamluk Bahri dynasty map (1250–1382) shows Basra as being under their area of control, and the Mongol Dominions map (1300–1405) shows Basra as being under Mongol control.

In 1290 fighting erupted at the Persian Gulf port of Basra among the Genoese, between the Guelph and the Ghibelline factions.

Ibn Battuta visited Basra in the 14th century, noting it "was renowned throughout the whole world, spacious in area and elegant in its courts, remarkable for its numerous fruit-gardens and its choice fruits, since it is the meeting place of the two seas, the salt and the fresh." Ibn Battuta also noted that Basra consisted of three-quarters: the Hudayl quarter, the Banu Haram quarter, and the Iranian quarter (mahallat al-Ajam). Fred Donner adds: "If the first two reveal that Basra was still predominantly an Arab town, the existence of an Iranian quarter clearly reveals the legacy of long centuries of intimate contact between Basra and the Iranian plateau."

The Arab Al-Mughamis tribe established control over Basra in the early fifteenth century, however, they quickly fell under influence of the Kara Koyunlu and Ak Koyunlu, successively. The Al-Mughamis' control of Basra had become nominal by 1436; de facto control of Basra from 1436 to 1508 was in the hands of the Moshasha. In the latter year, during the reign of King (Shah) Ismail I (1501–1524), the first Safavid ruler, Basra and the Moshasha became part of the Safavid Empire. This was the first time Basra had come under Safavid suzerainty. In 1524, following Ismail I's death, the local ruling dynasty of Basra, the Al-Mughamis, resumed effective control over the city. Twelve years later, in 1536, during the Ottoman-Safavid War of 1532-1555, the Bedouin ruler of Basra, Rashid ibn Mughamis, acknowledged Suleiman the Magnificent as his suzerain who in turn confirmed him as governor of Basra. The Arab provinces of the Ottoman Empire exercised a great deal of independence, and they even often raised their own troops. Though Basra had submitted to the Ottomans, the Ottoman hold over Basra was tenuous at the time. This changed a decade later; in 1546, following a tribal struggle involving the Moshasha and the local ruler of Zakiya (near Basra), the Ottomans sent a force to Basra. This resulted in tighter (but still, nominal) Ottoman control over Basra.

Portuguese empire

In 1523, the Portuguese under the command of António Tenreiro crossed from Aleppo to Basra. In 1550, the local Kingdom of Basra and tribal rulers trusted the Portuguese against the Ottomans, from then on the Portuguese threatened to invoke an invasion and conquest of Basra several times. From 1595 the Portuguese acted as military protectors of Basra, and in 1624 the Portuguese assisted the Ottoman Pasha of Basra  in repelling a Persian invasion. The Portuguese were granted a share of the customs revenue and freedom from tolls. From about 1625 until 1668, Basra and the Delta marshlands were in the hands of local chieftains independent of the Ottoman administration at Baghdad.

Ottoman and British rule

Basra was, for a long time, a flourishing commercial and cultural center. It was captured by the Ottoman Empire in 1668. It was fought over by Turks and Persians and was the scene of repeated attempts at resistance. From 1697 to 1701, Basra was once again under Safavid control.

The Zand Dynasty under Karim Khan Zand briefly occupied Basra after a long siege in 1775–9. The Zands attempted at introducing Usuli form of Shiism on a basically Akhbari Shia Basrans. The shortness of the Zand rule rendered this untenable.

In 1911, the Encyclopaedia Britannica reported "about 4000 Jews and perhaps 6000 Christians" living in Basra, but no Turks other than Ottoman officials. In 1884 the Ottomans responded to local pressure from the Shi'as of the south by detaching the southern districts of the Baghdad vilayet and creating a new vilayet of Basra.

After the Battle of Basra (1914) during World War I, the occupying British modernized the port (works designed by Sir George Buchanan); these British commercial interests made it one of the most important ports in the Persian Gulf, with shipping and trade links to the Far East.

Monarchy to Saddam era (1932-2003)
During World War II it was an important port through which flowed much of the equipment and supplies sent to the Soviet Union by the other allies. At the end of the Second World War, the population was some 93,000 people.

The population of Basra was 101,535 in 1947, and reached 219,167 in 1957. The University of Basrah was founded in 1964. By 1977, the population had risen to a peak population of some 1.5 million. The population declined during the Iran–Iraq War, being under 900,000 in the late 1980s, possibly reaching a low point of just over 400,000 during the worst of the war. The city was repeatedly shelled by Iran and was the site of many fierce battles, such as Operation Ramadan and Operation Karbala 5.

After the war, Saddam erected 99 memorial statues to Iraqi generals and commanders killed during the war along the bank of the Shatt-al-arab river, all pointing their fingers towards Iran. After the Gulf War, which the US called Operation Desert Storm, in 1991, a rebellion struck Basra. The widespread revolt was against Saddam Hussein who violently put down the rebellion, with much death and destruction inflicted on Basra.

On 25 January 1999, Basra was the scene of scores of civilian casualties when a missile fired by a US warplane was dropped in a civilian area. Eleven people were killed and fifty-nine were injured. General Anthony Zinni, then commander of US forces in the Persian Gulf, acknowledged that it was possible that "a missile may have been errant." While such casualty numbers pale in comparison to later events, the bombing occurred one day after Arab foreign ministers, meeting in Egypt, refused to condemn four days of air strikes against Iraq in December 1998. This was described by Iraqi information minister Human Abdel-Khaliq as giving the United States and Britain "an Arab green card" to attack Iraq.

A second revolt in 1999 led to mass executions in and around Basra. Subsequently, the Iraqi government deliberately neglected the city, and much commerce was diverted to Umm Qasr. These alleged abuses are to feature amongst the charges against the former regime to be considered by the Iraq Special Tribunal set up by the Iraq Interim Government following the 2003 invasion.

Workers in Basra's oil industry have been involved in extensive organization and labour conflict. They held a two-day strike in August 2003, and formed the nucleus of the independent General Union of Oil Employees (GUOE) in June 2004. The union held a one-day strike in July 2005, and publicly opposes plans for privatizing the industry.

Post-Saddam period (2003–present)

In March through to May 2003, the outskirts of Basra were the scene of some of the heaviest fighting in the beginning of the Iraq War in 2003. British forces, led by the 7th Armoured Brigade, took the city on 6 April 2003.  This city was the first stop for the United States and the United Kingdom during the 2003 invasion of Iraq.

On 21 April 2004, a series of bomb blasts ripped through the city, killing 74 people. The Multi-National Division (South-East), under British Command, was engaged in Security and Stabilization missions in Basra Governorate and surrounding areas during this time.  Political groups centered in Basra were reported to have close links with political parties already in power in the Iraqi government, despite opposition from Iraqi Sunnis and the Kurds. January 2005 elections saw several radical politicians gain office, supported by religious parties. American journalist Steven Vincent, who had been researching and reporting on corruption and militia activity in the city, was kidnapped and killed on 2 August 2005.

On 19 September 2005, two undercover British SAS soldiers disguised in Arab civilian clothes and headdresses opened fire on Iraqi police officers after having been stopped at a roadblock, killing two after the police attempted to pull them out of the car; the incident came amidst an increase in tensions between Iraqi policemen and British forces and allegations of illegal militia groups infiltrating the Iraqi Police. After the two soldiers were arrested and beaten, a British military force raided the jail they were being held in to rescue them, sparking confrontations between the soldiers and an angry crowd. The Ministry of Defence initially denied the operation, before claiming that the soldiers would have been executed were they not rescued.

British troops transferred control of Basra province to the Iraqi authorities in 2007, four-and-a-half years after the invasion. A BBC survey of local residents found that 86% thought the presence of British forces since 2003 had had an overall negative effect on the province.

Major-General Abdul Jalil Khalaf was appointed Police Chief by the central government with the task of taking on the militias.  He was outspoken against the targeting of women by the militias. Talking to the BBC, he said that his determination to tackle the militia had led to almost daily assassination attempts. This was taken as sign that he was serious in opposing the militias.

In March 2008, the Iraqi Army launched a major offensive, code-named Saulat al-Fursan (Charge of the White Knights), aimed at forcing the Mahdi Army out of Basra.  The assault was planned by General Mohan Furaiji and approved by Iraqi Prime Minister Nouri al-Maliki.

In April 2008, following the failure to disarm militant groups, both Major-General Abdul Jalil Khalaf and General Mohan Furaiji were removed from their positions in Basra.

Basra was scheduled to host the 22nd Arabian Gulf Cup tournament in Basra Sports City, a newly built multi-use sports complex. The tournament was shifted to Riyadh, Saudi Arabia, after concerns over preparations and security.  Iraq was also due to host the 2013 tournament, but that was moved to Bahrain. At least 10 demonstrators died as they protested against the lack of clean drinking water and electrical power in the city during the height of summer in 2018. Some protesters stormed the Iranian consulate in the city.

Geography

Basra is located in the Arabian Peninsula on the Shatt-Al-Arab waterway, downstream of which is the Persian Gulf. The Shatt-Al-Arab and Basra waterways define the eastern and western borders of Basra, respectively. The city is penetrated by a complex network of canals and streams, vital for irrigation and other agricultural use. These canals were once used to transport goods and people throughout the city, but during the last two decades, pollution and a continuous drop in water levels have made river navigation impossible in the canals.

Climate
Basra has a hot desert climate (Köppen climate classification BWh), like the rest of the surrounding region, though it receives slightly more precipitation than inland locations due to its location near the coast. During the summer months, from June to August, Basra is consistently one of the hottest cities on the planet, with temperatures regularly exceeding  in July and August. On some winter nights, minimum temperatures are below . High humidity – sometimes exceeding 90% – is common due to the proximity to the marshy Persian Gulf.

This is one of the hottest temperatures ever measured on the planet.

Effect of climate change 
The city of Basra was once well known for its agriculture, but that has since altered due to rising temperatures, increased water salinity, and desertification.

Demographics

In Basra the vast majority of the population are ethnic Arabs of the Adnanite or the Qahtanite tribes. The tribes located in Basra include Bani Malik, Al-shwelat, Suwa'id, Al-bo Mohammed, Al-Badr, Al-Ubadi, Ruba'ah Sayyid tribes (descendants of the Islamic prophet Muhammed) and other Marsh Arabs tribes.

In addition to the Arabs, there is also a community of Afro-Iraqi peoples, known as Zanj. The Zanj are an African Muslim ethnic group living in Iraq and are a mix of African peoples taken from the coast of the area of modern-day Kenya as slaves in the 900s. They now number around 200,000 in Iraq.

Religion
Basra is a major Shia city, with the old Akhbari Shiism progressively being overwhelmed by the Usuli Shiism. The Sunni Muslim population is small and dropping in their percentage as more Iraqi Shias move into Basra for various job or welfare opportunities. The satellite town of Az Zubayr in the direction of Kuwait was a Sunni majority town, but the burgeoning population of Basra has spilled over into Zubair, turning it into an extension of Basra with a slight Shia majority as well.

Assyrians were recorded in the Ottoman census as early as 1911, and a small number of them live in Basra. However, a significant number of the modern community are refugees fleeing persecution from ISIS in the Nineveh Plains, Mosul, and northern Iraq. But ever since the victory of Iraq against ISIS in 2017, many Christians have returned to their Homeland in the Nineveh plains. In 2018 there are about a few thousand Christians in Basra. One of the largest communities of pre-Islamic Mandaeans live in the city, whose headquarters was in the area formerly called Suk esh-Sheikh.

Cityscape

 The old mosque of Basra, the first mosque in Islam outside the Arabian peninsula.
 Sinbad Island is located in the centre of Shatt Al-Arab, near the Miinaalmakl, and extends above the bridge Khaled and is a tourist landmark.
 The Muhhmad Baquir Al-Sadr Bridge, at the union of the Tigris and Euphrates Rivers, was completed in 2017.
 Sayab's House Ruins is the site of the most famous home of the poet Badr Shakir al-Sayyab. There is also a statue of Sayab, one of the statues in Basra done by the artist and sculptor nada' Kadhum, located on al-Basrah Corniche; it was unveiled in 1972.
 Basra Sports City is the largest sport city in the Middle East, located on the Shatt al-Basra.
 Palm tree forests are largely located on the shores of shatt-al Arab waterway, especially in the nearby village of Abu Al-Khasib.
 Corniche al-Basra is a street which runs on the shore of the Shatt al-Arab; it goes from the Lion of Babylon Square to the Four Palaces.
 Basra International Hotel (formally known as Basra Sheraton Hotel) is located on the Corniche street. The only five star hotel in the city, it is notable for its Shanasheel style exterior design. The hotel was heavily looted during the Iraq War, and it has been renovated recently.
 Sayyed Ali al-Musawi Mosque, also known as the Mosque of the Children of Amer, is located in the city centre, on Al-Gazear Street, and it was built for Shia Imami's leader Sayyed Ali al-Moussawi, whose followers lived in Iraq and neighbouring countries.
 The Fun City of Basra, which is now called Basra Land, is one of the oldest theme-park entertainment cities in the south of the country, and the largest involving a large number of games giants. It was damaged during the war, and has been rebuilt.
 Akhora Park is one of the city's older parks. It is located on al-Basra Street.
 There are four formal presidential palaces in Basra.
 The Latin Church is located on the 14th of July Street.
 Indian Market (Amogaiz) is one of the main bazaars in the city. It is called the Indian Market, since it had Indian vendors working there at the beginning of the last century.
 Hanna-Sheikh Bazaar is an old market; it was established by the powerful and famous Hanna-Sheikh family.

Economy

Its economy is largely dependent on the oil industry. Iraq has the world's 4th largest oil reserves estimated to be more . Some of Iraq's largest oil fields are located in the province, and most of Iraq's oil exports leave from Al Basrah Oil Terminal. The Basra Oil Company (formerly South Oil Company) has its headquarters in the city.

Substantial economic activity in Basra is centred around the petrochemical industry, which includes the Southern Fertilizer Company and The State Company for Petrochemical Industries (SCPI). The Southern Fertilizer Company produces ammonia solution, urea and nitrogen gas, while the SCPI focus on such products as ethylene, caustic/chlorine, vinyl chloride monomer (VCM), polyvinyl chloride (PVC), low-density polyethylene, and high-density polyethylene.

Basra is in a fertile agricultural region, with major products including rice, maize corn, barley, pearl millet, wheat, dates, and livestock. For a long time, Basra was known for the superior quality of its dates. Basra was known in the 1960s for its sugar market, a fact that figured heavily in the English contract law remoteness of damages case The Heron II [1969] 1 AC 350.

Shipping, logistics and transport are also major industries in Basra. Basra is home to all of Iraq's six ports; Umm Qasr is the main deep-water port with 22 platforms, some of which are dedicated to specific goods (such as sulphur, seeds, lubricant oil, etc.) The other five ports are smaller in scale and more narrowly specialized. Fishing was an important business before the oil boom. The city also has an international airport, with service into Baghdad with Iraqi Airways—the national airline.

Sports

The city is home to the largest sports stadium in Iraq, the Basra International Stadium, which hosts several matches of the Iraq national football team. The city is also home to sports team Al-Minaa, that uses Al-Minaa Olympic Stadium as its home venue. Its basketball division is among the elite Arab teams that compete at the Arab Club Basketball Championship.

In fiction
In Voltaire's Zadig "Bassora" is the site of an international market where the hero meets representatives of all the world religions and concludes that "the world is one large family which meets at Bassora."
The city of Basra has a major role in H. G. Wells's 1933 future history "The Shape of Things to Come," where the "Modern State" is at the centre of a world state emerging after a collapse of civilization, and becomes in effect the capital of the world.
In the 1940 film The Thief of Bagdad, Ahmad and Abu flee to the city from Bagdad. Ahmad falls in love with the sultan's beautiful daughter, who is also desired by his enemy, and former Grand Vizier, Jaffar.
In Scott K. Andrews' "Operation Motherland," the second book in the post-apocalyptic "Afterblight Chronicles," the character Lee Keegan crash lands his plane in the streets of Basra during the opening chapter.

Famous citizens
 Rabi'a al-'Adawiyya, known as Rabia of Basra, early Muslim mystic
 Sean Polley, English cricketer, 1981 born in Basra
 Saadi Youssef, poet from Basra
 Reham Yacoub, female activist

Twin towns and sister cities
Basra is twinned with:
Houston, Texas, United States
Nishapur, Iran
Baku, Azerbaijan
Aqaba, Jordan

See also
 List of largest cities of Iraq
 Afro Iraqis
 Basra International Airport
 Dua Kumayl
 Basra reed warbler
 University of Basrah
 Umm Qasr Port

Notes

References

Bibliography

  
Hallaq, Wael. The Origins and Evolution of Islamic Law. Cambridge University Press, 2005
Hawting, Gerald R. The First Dynasty of Islam. Routledge. 2nd ed, 2000
 
Madelung, Wilferd. "Abd Allah b. al-Zubayr and the Mahdi" in the Journal of Near Eastern Studies 40. 1981. pp. 291–305.
 
 
Tillier, Mathieu. Les cadis d'Iraq et l'Etat abbasside (132/750-334/945). Institut Français du Proche-Orient, 2009
Vincent, Stephen. Into The Red Zone:  A Journey into the Soul of Iraq. .

External links

Iraq Inter-Agency Information & Analysis Unit Reports, Maps and Assessments of Iraq's Governorates from the UN Inter-Agency Information & Analysis Unit
Iraq Image – Basra Satellite Observation 
2003 Basra map (NIMA)
Boomtown Basra
Muhammad and the Spread of Islam by Sanderson Beck
The Textual History of the Qur'an, Arthur Jeffery, 1946
Codex of Abu Musa al-Ashari, Arthur Jeffery, 1936

Basra
District capitals of Iraq
Amṣar
Cities in Iraq
Levant
7th-century establishments in Asia
636 establishments
Populated places established in the 7th century